The Englishman of the Bones (Spanish: El inglés de los güesos) is a 1924 Argentine novel by Benito Lynch. It is part of the Gaucho literature movement. A major theme of the novel is the cultural exchanges between the British and the Argentine characters. In 1940 it was adapted into a film of the same title directed by Carlos Hugo Christensen.

Synopsis
A young English expert on fossils meets and has a relationship with a gaucho woman while he is investigating the remains of indigenous people in Argentina. When he leaves, she is overcome with despair and kills herself.

References

Bibliography
 Huberman, Ariana. Gauchos and Foreigners: Glossing Culture and Identity in the Argentine Countryside. Lexington Books, 2010.
 Torres-Rioseco, Arturo. The Epic of Latin American Literature. University of California Press, 1961.

1924 Argentine novels
Novels set in Argentina
Novels by Benito Lynch
Argentine novels adapted into films